"Mía" is the third single by Puerto Rican reggaeton artist Tito "El Bambino", from his debut studio album Top of the Line, released in October 2007. It was co-written and produced by Nely "El Arma Secreta". It features Daddy Yankee, who also co-wrote the song.

Chart performance
The song proved to be a major success during 2006, peaking at #12 on the Billboard Hot Latin Songs chart. It even managed to perform well on the Latin Tropical Airplay chart, peaking at #9.

Chart positions

References

2006 singles
Tito El Bambino songs
Daddy Yankee songs
Songs written by Daddy Yankee
2006 songs
Songs written by Tito El Bambino